The Adventures of Mr. Pickwick is a 1921 British silent comedy film directed by Thomas Bentley based on the 1837 novel The Pickwick Papers by Charles Dickens. As of August 2010, the film is missing from the BFI National Archive, and is listed as one of the British Film Institute's "75 Most Wanted" lost films.

Cast
 Frederick Volpe as Samuel Pickwick (as Fred Volpe)
 Mary Brough as Mrs. Bardell
 Bransby Williams as Sgt. Buzfuz
 Ernest Thesiger as Mr. Jingle
 Kathleen Vaughan as Arabella Allen
 Joyce Dearsley as Isabella Wardle
 Arthur Cleave as Mr. Nathaniel Winkle
 Athene Seyler as Rachel Wardle
 John Kelt as Mr. Augustus Snodgrass
 Hubert Woodward as Sam Weller
 Norman Page as Justice Stoneleigh

See also
 List of lost films

References

External links

British Film Institute 75 Most Wanted entry, with extensive notes

1921 films
1920s historical comedy films
1921 lost films
British historical comedy films
British silent feature films
British black-and-white films
Films directed by Thomas Bentley
Films based on The Pickwick Papers
Films set in the 1820s
Ideal Film Company films
Lost British films
Lost comedy films
1920s British films
Silent historical comedy films